Banglar Nayok is a Bangladeshi Bengali-language commercial and social action based  film. The film was directed by Dewan Nazrul. It was released throughout Bangladesh in 1995. It was produced by Jams Bangladesh Pvt. Ltd.

The film stars Jashim, Shabana, Riaz, Sonia and many more. Also the story written by hero Jashim. This was Riaz's film debut, though he was not the lead, and only appears in the supporting hero.

Plot
Press reporter old man 'Anowar Hossain' (Anowar Hossain) published the daily news paper and most wanted criminal 'Rowshan Chowdhury’s' (Ahmed Sharif) criminal effect. After someday Rowshan Chowdhury  killed Press reporter Anowar Hossain and his adolescent 'Rokeya' (Shabana) promises with him these killers take most punishment venture. After 12 year Rokeya gets be a professional lawyer. And a competitor mafia 'Don' (Jashim) he can trust to arms is all power with encouragement, also Rokeya with encouragement can trust to pen is all power. Rokeya’s small brother 'Munna' (Riaz) student of a university and 'Jully' (Sonia) also same university student. First time botheration with these duo and second time through the love relation. But Jully’s brother accepts it not. Rowshan Chowdhury and Don now start a war for take Don place. Don's sister Jully has gone to her lover Munna. Don losts his Don place to save his sister. Don now not Don he is now Banglar Nayok. 'Banglar Nayok' at the present so far the previous career now he has got back normal life living with Rokeya, Jully and Munna. Finished the story as 'Banglar Nayok' finally killed most wanted criminal Rowshan Chowdhury at the end. Reciprocally live all are.

Cast
 Jashim as Don
 Shabana as Rokeya
 Riaz as Munna
 Sonia as Jully
 Anwar Hossain as Anwar Hossain
 Ahmed Sharif as Rowshan Chowdhury
 Azim
 Gangua

Music
Banglar Nayok film music directed by Hossain Ali. And playback singers Runa Laila, Andrew Kishore and others.

Sound track

References

External links

1995 films
1995 action films
Bangladeshi action films
Bengali-language Bangladeshi films
1990s Bengali-language films
Bangladeshi films about revenge